Yizhar Cohen (born August 12, 1962), also known as Izhar Cohen, is an Israeli paralympic swimmer.

Biography
Cohen was born in Kibbutz Degania Alef. In 1985 he was blinded by a Land mine while serving with the Israel Defense Forces.

Cohen works as a Shiatsu therapist and is married and father of two.

Swimming career
Following his loss of eyesight he began practicing disabled sports in athletics and swimming. Since 1987 he has taken part in international competitions, including six Paralympic Games held between 1988 and 2008. Until 2004 he also took part in four world championships and eight European championships.

Cohen swims in breaststroke, butterfly, freestyle and backstroke. In 2008, he focused on freestyle swimming. At the 1987 European Championship in Moscow, he won four gold medals. In the 1988 Summer Paralympics he won three gold medals and one silver. He won more medals at the 1992 Summer Paralympics (1 bronze) and the 1996 Summer Paralympics (1 silver).

At the 2008 Summer Paralympics, Cohen was the Israeli flag bearer.

See also
 Sports in Israel

References

External links
 

1962 births
Living people
Israeli blind people
Israeli male freestyle swimmers
Paralympic swimmers of Israel
Swimmers at the 1988 Summer Paralympics
Swimmers at the 1992 Summer Paralympics
Swimmers at the 1996 Summer Paralympics
Swimmers at the 2000 Summer Paralympics
Swimmers at the 2004 Summer Paralympics
Swimmers at the 2008 Summer Paralympics
Paralympic gold medalists for Israel
Paralympic bronze medalists for Israel
Paralympic silver medalists for Israel
Medalists at the 1988 Summer Paralympics
Medalists at the 1992 Summer Paralympics
Medalists at the 1996 Summer Paralympics
Paralympic medalists in swimming
S11-classified Paralympic swimmers